Davlat Usmon is a Tajikistani politician.

Career
Usmon was a founding member of the Islamic Renaissance Party of Tajikistan in 1991, and one of its first deputy chairmen.

Usmon was a field commander for the United Tajik Opposition during the Tajikistan Civil War of the 1990s. A former Economics Minister, he was the Islamic Renaissance Party's candidate in the 1991 and 1999 presidential elections. He lost the election to incumbent president, Emomali Rahmon, gaining only 2.1% of the vote amidst criticism that the election was not free and fair.

References

Living people
Year of birth missing (living people)
Islamic Renaissance Party of Tajikistan politicians